Amblyseius irinae is a species of mite in the family Phytoseiidae.

References

irinae
Articles created by Qbugbot
Animals described in 1973